Henry Wenman (1875-1953) was a British actor.

He was a brother of theatrical producer Charles Wenman, who had a substantial career in Australia.

Filmography

References

External links
 

1875 births
1953 deaths
British male film actors
British male stage actors
Male actors from Leeds
20th-century British male actors